The Isis Branch Railway Line was a narrow gauge railway line in Queensland, Australia. It was approved for construction by the Parliament of Queensland in September, 1885. The North Coast line north from Brisbane, reached Maryborough in August 1881, Howard in March 1883 and Goodwood, to the south of Bundaberg, in August 1887.

The first section branched in a westerly direction from the North Coast line south of Goodwood at Isis Junction.  Opened on 31 October 1887, Childers formed at the terminus and stops were established en route at Bootharh, Horton and Doolbi. The Childers station site is now part of the Isis District State High School grounds. The line enabled development of sugarcane production in the region and a short extension northwest via Huxley, Lynwood and Kowbi to Cordalba opened on 1 June 1896.  Kowbi was originally named Hapsburg, but following a large upswell of Anti-German sentiment in Australia after World War I it was changed to the local Aboriginal name for "sugar" .  The line serviced early sugar mills at Knockroe (near Kowbi), Huxley and Doolbi until they were taken over by the Isis Central Mill.

Another fifty kilometre extension southwest to Dallarnil was approved in December 1909 and opened on 6 May 1913.   En route stops were built at Thynne, Marule, Junien, Booyal, Munderbong, Tawah, Stanton and Kukar.  The Dallarnil extension should never have been built.  Much of the country was infertile and the prospect of agricultural development was overestimated.  Small quantities of sugarcane, railway sleepers, cream, lime and cattle were carried but only in spasmodic fashion.

Two trains a week were enough to meet the low volume of traffic and the service beyond Cordalba ceased on 1 July 1955.  The Isis Central Mill purchased the Cordalba Dallarnil section for intended conversion to 2 feet tramway but road transport was preferred.  The rest of the line closed on 1 July 1964 in response to transport of bulk sugar by road and sugarcane by mill owned tramways.

See also
Rail transport in Queensland

References 

G H Verhoeven "The Isis Branch Line" ARHS Bulletin May 1963

Rod Milne "West of Cordalba" ARHS Bulletin June 1993

External links 
 Queensland Places | Isis Shire
 1925 map of the Queensland railway system

Closed railway lines in Queensland
3 ft 6 in gauge railways in Australia
Railway lines in Queensland
Railway lines opened in 1887
Railway lines closed in 1964
Wide Bay–Burnett
1887 establishments in Australia
1964 disestablishments in Australia